Wallace Creek is a stream in Bandera County, Texas and Kerr County, Texas, in the United States.

Wallace Creek was named in the 1850s for Bigfoot Wallace, who owned land near there.

See also
List of rivers of Texas

References

Rivers of Bandera County, Texas
Rivers of Kerr County, Texas
Rivers of Texas